"The Nights" is a song by Swedish DJ and record producer Avicii, featuring vocals from singer/songwriter Nicholas Furlong. On 1 December 2014, it was released as a digital download by PRMD Music and Universal Island on Avicii's The Days / Nights EP, then on 11 January 2015 in the United Kingdom. The song peaked at number six on the UK Singles Chart and number one on the UK Dance Chart. On 23 January 2015, Avicii released "The Nights (Avicii by Avicii)", his own remix of the song. The song appears on the UK version of Avicii's second studio album Stories (2015).

Background
Furlong noted that he began writing the song as an ode to his father. The inspiration for the “pirate-y fight song” sound came to him while at a bar in Ireland. Furlong sent the original idea, titled "My Father Told Me", to Arash Pournouri, Avicii's manager. Pournouri recognised an immediate draw to the track, saying that the song had that same sense of euphoria which characterises so much of Avicii's music. 
In an interview with Yahoo! Music, Pournouri said: "It made absolute sense to work on it with Nick...[Avicii and I just needed] to make it more 'us' and that's what [we] did."

Like his previous hits "Wake Me Up" and "Hey Brother", "The Nights" is a progressive house song containing elements of folk rock.

Music video
On December 15, 2014, the official music video for "The Nights" was released on YouTube. The video was produced, directed by, and stars "professional life liver" Rory Kramer, who filmed an exuberant action-packed recollection of his own life on roller coasters, surfing, snowboarding, skateboarding, balloon flying, making a four-door convertible out of a Toyota, etc. – living a life to be remembered. As of February 2023, the music video has over 900 million views.

In popular culture
"The Nights" was featured as a part of the football game by EA Sports, FIFA 15. In 2014, SportsCenter on ESPN used The Nights as a song to round out the year in sports. It was also used as the Carolina Hurricanes’ goal song from 2015 to 2018. 

The song was later interpolated by British rappers SwitchOTR and A1 x J1 in 2021 for their song "Coming For You", which peaked at number five on the UK Singles Chart and was certified Gold by the BPI.

Credits and personnel
Recording
Recorded at Foxy Studios, Los Angeles, California

Personnel
Songwriting – Nicholas Furlong, Gabriel Benjamin, Jordan Suecof, John Feldmann, Avicii
Production – Avicii
Co-production – Arash Pournouri
Vocals – Nicholas Furlong
Engineering and vocal production – Zakk Cervini
Acoustic guitar – Colin Brittain
Lap steel guitar – Will Carter
Live drums – Jordan Suecof
Additional vocals — The Mighty Riot

Charts

Weekly charts

Year-end charts

Certifications

References

2014 singles
Avicii songs
Songs written by Avicii
Song recordings produced by Avicii
Universal Records singles
2014 songs
Songs written by John Feldmann
Songs written by Infinity (producer)
Songs written by Nicholas Furlong (musician)
Folktronica songs
Songs about death
Songs about nights
Songs about nostalgia